Phil Jackson Ford Jr. (born February 9, 1956) is an American former professional basketball player in the National Basketball Association (NBA). He graduated from Rocky Mount Senior High School in 1974, and had an All-American college career with the North Carolina Tar Heels.

College career
Ford was the first freshman under head basketball coach Dean Smith to start in his first collegiate basketball game. During the season, he averaged 16.4 points and 5.2 assists per game – both of which were UNC freshman records that would stand for more than 20 years. Ford led UNC to a second-place finish in the Atlantic Coast Conference regular season standings, and then to a championship win over NC State in the 1975 ACC tournament. This win broke N.C. State's two-year winning streak as ACC champions. Ford averaged 26 points in the tournament and was named tournament MVP – the first freshman in ACC history to achieve that honor.

In his sophomore season, Ford averaged 18.6 points and 7.0 assists per game. His assists average established a UNC single-season record until Ed Cota averaged 7.4 assists during the 1997–98 season. Ford led UNC to a first-place finish during the ACC regular season and was a first team All-ACC selection, an honor he would also receive in his junior and senior seasons. He also was a consensus second team All-American.

In his junior season, Ford averaged 18.7 points and 6.6 assists per game while once again leading the Tar Heels to a first-place ACC regular season finish. In the 1977 ACC tournament, Ford scored 26 points in the championship game against the Virginia to propel UNC to another conference title. In the 1977 NCAA Division I basketball tournament, Ford helped advance the Tar Heels into the Final Four and all the way to the NCAA Championship Game, despite hyperextending his shooting elbow in the regional semifinal game against Notre Dame. Ford was named a consensus first team All-American at the end of the season.

In his senior season, Ford averaged 20.8 points and 5.7 assists per game, and scored a career-high 34 points in his final home game – a victory against Duke, which clinched another ACC first-place finish for the Tar Heels. At the end of the season, Ford repeated as a consensus first-team All-American and was recognized as the National Player of the Year when he won the USBWA, NABC and Sporting News Player of the Year awards, as well as the John R. Wooden Award.

NBA career
Ford was the second overall pick in the first round of the NBA draft. While being coached by Cotton Fitzsimmons and forming a dynamic backcourt duo with Otis Birdsong which was noticed by many across the league, Ford was named NBA Rookie of the Year with the Kansas City Kings in 1979. During that season, on February 21, 1979, Ford recorded a career best 22 assists, while also scoring 26 points, grabbing 5 rebounds, and recording 5 steals, in a 133-117 win over the Milwaukee Bucks. During the 1980-81 NBA season, Ford scored a career high 38 points in a 113-107 win over the Houston Rockets on January 23, 1981. Just weeks later, Ford was forced to undergo surgery for a season ending eye injury, after which the Kings unexpectedly made it to the Western Conference Finals despite having a regular season record of 40-42.  After the season, Ford struggled to return to his previous level of play, and was traded to the Nets, then traded to the Bucks, before being released and playing out his career on the Rockets.

In 482 NBA games, Ford scored 5,594 points, an 11.6 average, and had 3,083 assists, an average of 6.4 per game. He retired from the NBA in 1985.

National team career
After his sophomore season, Ford was the starting point guard for the 1976 U.S. Olympic team, coached by Dean Smith, which won the gold medal. In six Olympic games, Ford totaled 54 assists for a 9.0 assists per game average.

Style of play
Ford was known as an excellent ballhandler and penetrator who possessed a very accurate pull-up jump shot. He was also very adept at making free throws, especially in the final minutes of close games. His ballhandling and free-throw shooting skill allowed him to be at his best when running Carolina's Four Corners offense, an offensive strategy that some college teams used to either stall or score only when taking extremely safe shots. However, when Ford was dribbling the ball in the center of the four corners alignment, he often found teammates for quick, easy baskets or drew fouls on the other team. Coach Smith often employed this offense when UNC needed to protect a lead in the final minutes of a game, and Ford's abilities all but ensured that such a lead would be maintained. Ford also mastered the 360-degree spinning layup.

Legacy
Ford is widely considered to be among the greatest college point guards of all time, and some contend he is still the greatest point guard ever to play in the ACC. He finished his career at Carolina as the all-time leading scorer in school history, with 2,290 points. He also set school and ACC career records for total assists, with 753 (a mark since broken by several other players). On December 18, 2008, Tyler Hansbrough surpassed Ford's career scoring total. He also finished his career as the only player in Atlantic Coast Conference history to score over 2,000 points and register at least 600 assists (a record now shared with Travis Best of Georgia Tech and Greivis Vásquez of Maryland). Ford was especially productive in ACC Tournament play, as he averaged 23.6 points per game in 8 career tournament contests.

In both his Junior and Senior years, Ford won the ACC Athlete of the Year award, making him one of just a few ACC athletes ever to win the award twice.

Ford was inducted into the North Carolina Sports Hall of Fame in May 1991. In 2002, Ford was named to the ACC 50th Anniversary men's basketball team honoring the fifty best players in ACC history.

Career statistics

NBA

Regular season

|-
| style="text-align:left;"|
| style="text-align:left;"|Kansas City
| 79 ||  || 34.5 || .465 ||  || .813 || 2.3 || 8.6 || 2.2 || .1 || 15.9
|-
| style="text-align:left;"|
| style="text-align:left;"|Kansas City
| 82 ||  || 32.0 || .462 || .174 || .818 || 2.1 || 7.4 || 1.7 || .0 || 16.2
|-
| style="text-align:left;"|
| style="text-align:left;"|Kansas City
| 66 ||  || 34.7 || .478 || .306 || .831 || 1.9 || 8.8 || 1.5 || .1 || 17.5
|-
| style="text-align:left;"|
| style="text-align:left;"|Kansas City
| 72 || 65 || 27.1 || .439 || .219 || .819 || 1.5 || 6.3 || .9 || .0 || 9.9
|-
| style="text-align:left;"|
| style="text-align:left;"|New Jersey
| 7 || 7 || 23.3 || .571 || .000 || .700 || 1.0 || 5.4 || .9 || .0 || 6.7
|-
| style="text-align:left;"|
| style="text-align:left;"|Milwaukee
| 70 || 56 || 20.7 || .471 || .125 || .796 || 1.4 || 3.6 || .7 || .0 || 6.8
|-
| style="text-align:left;"|
| style="text-align:left;"|Houston
| 81 || 55 || 24.9 || .502 || .133 || .838 || 1.7 || 5.1 || .7 || .1 || 7.1
|-
| style="text-align:left;"|
| style="text-align:left;"|Houston
| 25 || 1 || 11.6 || .298 || .000 || .889 || 1.1 || 2.4 || .2 || .0 || 1.8
|- class="sortbottom"
| style="text-align:center;" colspan="2"|Career
| 482 || 184 || 28.0 || .467 || .210 || .820 || 1.8 || 6.4 || 1.2 || .1 || 11.6

Playoffs

|-
| style="text-align:left;"|1979
| style="text-align:left;"|Kansas City
| 8 ||  || 28.6 || .263 ||  || .563 || 2.4 || 5.8 || 2.4 || .0 || 7.8
|-
| style="text-align:left;"|1980
| style="text-align:left;"|Kansas City
| 3 ||  || 36.7 || .465 || .750 || .818 || 2.0 || 8.7 || 1.7 || .0 || 17.3
|-
| style="text-align:left;"|1981
| style="text-align:left;"|Kansas City
| 5 ||  || 31.6 || .429 || .000 || .692 || 1.6 || 5.8 || 1.0 || .0 || 7.8
|-
| style="text-align:left;"|1983
| style="text-align:left;"|Milwaukee
| 2 ||  || 2.5 || .000 ||  || 1.000 || .0 || .5 || .0 || .0 || 3.0
|- class="sortbottom"
| style="text-align:center;" colspan="2"|Career
| 15 ||  || 27.7 || .365 || .600 || .717 || 1.7 || 5.7 || 1.5 || .0 || 9.1

College

|-
| style="text-align:left;"|1974–75
| style="text-align:left;"|North Carolina
| 31 ||  ||  || .516 ||  || .783 || 2.7 || 5.2 ||  ||  || 16.4
|-
| style="text-align:left;"|1975–76
| style="text-align:left;"|North Carolina
| 29 ||  ||  || .532 ||  || .780 || 1.8 || 7.0 || 1.8 || .0 || 18.6
|-
| style="text-align:left;"|1976–77
| style="text-align:left;"|North Carolina
| 33 ||  ||  || .534 ||  || .853 || 1.9 || 6.6 || 1.7 || .0 || 18.7
|-
| style="text-align:left;"|1977–78
| style="text-align:left;"|North Carolina
| 30 ||  ||  || .527 ||  || .810 || 2.1 || 5.7 || 1.8 || .1 || 20.8
|- class="sortbottom"
| style="text-align:center;" colspan="2"|Career
| 123 ||  ||  || .527 ||  || .808 || 2.1 || 6.1 || 1.8 || .1 || 18.6

Coaching career
In 1988, he returned to North Carolina as an assistant coach, and helped lead the Tar Heels to the 1993 national title. After Smith retired in 1997, Ford became the top assistant to his successor, Bill Guthridge. Ford left the school following UNC's 1999–2000 season in which they reached the Final Four, along with the rest of Guthridge's staff, when Matt Doherty took over as head coach with his own coaching staff.

Ford currently works for the Educational Foundation, the fund-raising arm of the University of North Carolina athletic department. He also briefly served as color commentator on UNC basketball broadcasts.

Ford served as an assistant coach to Larry Brown for the Detroit Pistons (2004–2005). After a brief stint as an assistant coach to Isiah Thomas for the New York Knicks (2005–2007), Ford was retained in the same position by the Charlotte Bobcats' new head coach Larry Brown from June 2008 to 2010.

References

External links

 College statistics at Sports-Reference.com
 North Carolina Tar Heels bio
 Coach profile at NBA.com

1956 births
Living people
African-American basketball players
All-American college men's basketball players
American men's basketball coaches
American men's basketball players
Basketball coaches from North Carolina
Basketball players at the 1976 Summer Olympics
Basketball players from North Carolina
Charlotte Bobcats assistant coaches
Detroit Pistons assistant coaches
Kansas City Kings draft picks
Kansas City Kings players
Medalists at the 1976 Summer Olympics
Milwaukee Bucks players
National Collegiate Basketball Hall of Fame inductees
New York Knicks assistant coaches
North Carolina Tar Heels men's basketball announcers
North Carolina Tar Heels men's basketball coaches
North Carolina Tar Heels men's basketball players
Olympic gold medalists for the United States in basketball
Parade High School All-Americans (boys' basketball)
Point guards
Sportspeople from Rocky Mount, North Carolina
United States men's national basketball team players
21st-century African-American people
20th-century African-American sportspeople